Froilan Ochea Quiño is a Filipino politician from Compostela, Cebu, Philippines. He currently serves as the mayor of Compostela. Quiño previously served as councilor of Compostela and as Association of Barangay Councils (ABC) President.

References

Living people
1987 births